Andrea de la Nava Manzano (born 11 February 1994) is a Spanish footballer who plays as a goalkeeper for Athletic Club.

Club career
De la Nava started her career at Pauldarrak.

References

External links

 

1994 births
Living people
Women's association football goalkeepers
Spanish women's footballers
Footballers from Barakaldo
EdF Logroño players
Athletic Club Femenino players
Primera División (women) players
Primera Federación (women) players